Croc Drop is an SBF Visa drop tower flat ride, which opened in April 2021 at Chessington World of Adventures Resort in southwest London, England, forming part of the park's Forbidden Kingdom section.

History 
Following the closure of Rameses Revenge at the end of 2019, plans were soon spotted for a multi-million pound replacement drop tower. Two years on, it opened alongside the Blue Barnacle for the 2021 season in Forbidden Kingdom. The ride is manufactured by the SBF Visa Group and is the third model of its type in Britain, after Skyraker 001 at Flambards and Magma at Paultons Park. Croc Drop marks the first significant new ride hardware at Chessington since Zufari and Kobra.

In 2020, the ride's name was opposed by the American footwear manufacturer Crocs. The opposition was not upheld by the UK Intellectual Property Office and the ride's name was retained.

Description 
As with all rides of its type, a gondola with 16 seats is lifted to the top of a large vertical structure, then released to free-fall down the tower. Brakes slow the gondola as it approaches the bottom of the ride. This design expands on this concept with features including rotating gondolas and several bounces before coming to rest. The total weight of the ride is around 26,000 kg and it rotates at 6 rpm.

The ride's soundtrack has been composed by Nick Hutson alongside Kieron Quinn.

Set to ‘drop’ in spring, those daring will plunge 25m into the giant jaws of a crocodile, Sobek, the ancient Egyptian Crocodile God and protector of the Nile, who has been possessed by evil spirits, transforming him into a cruel deity. With the once fertile Nile laying stagnant, riders must take part in a ceremony to banish the evil spirits from Sobek, plunging into the crocodile's soul and freeing the waters back into the Nile. Chessington ran a teaser campaign throughout 2020 for the new attraction, with mysterious clues posted on their social media channels for people to solve.

Those between 1.2m and 1.3m must be accompanied by an adult over the age of 16, while those a minimum height of 1.3m can ‘drop’ alone.

Gallery

References

External links 
 

Chessington World of Adventures rides
Amusement rides introduced in 2021
Amusement rides manufactured by SBF Visa Group
2021 establishments in the United Kingdom